A hydraulic seal is a relatively soft, non-metallic ring, captured in a groove or fixed in a combination of rings, forming a seal assembly, to block or separate fluid in reciprocating motion applications.  Hydraulic seals are vital in machinery. Their use is critical in providing a way for fluid power to be converted to linear motion.

Materials
Hydraulic seals can be made from a variety of materials such as polyurethane, rubber or PTFE. The type of material is determined by the specific operating conditions or limits due to fluid type, pressure, fluid chemical compatibility or temperature.

Static
A static hydraulic seal is located in a groove and sees no movement - only sealing within its confined space, acting like a gasket. To achieve this the gasket should be under pressure. The pressure is applied by tightening of the bolts.

Dynamic
A type of dynamic hydraulic seal called a rod seal is exposed to movement on its inner diameter along the shaft or rod of a hydraulic cylinder.  Hydraulic Piston seals prevent fluid from crossing the area of the piston head.  Rod seals ensure that fluid does not leak from the cylinder and adequate pressure is maintained.  Wiper seals are installed to prevent contamination from entering the hydraulic system.  A rod seal prevents leakage of hydraulic fluid to the outside of the sealing system. Additionally, rod seals help contribute, in combination with a wiper seal, to preventing contamination of the environment. A type of dynamic hydraulic seal called a piston seal is exposed to movement on its outer diameter along the tube or bore of a hydraulic cylinder.  Different Piston Seal profiles offer distinct advantages depending on the sealing application. Temperature, Pressure, Stroke Speed and other environmental considerations would lead users to different profiles and materials.

References

Hydraulics